WCKG (1530 AM) is a radio station licensed to Elmhurst, Illinois, United States. The station serves the Chicago area and is owned by DuPage Radio, LLC. The station operates during daytime hours only. Hours of operation are determined by the Federal Communications Commission (FCC); daytime broadcasting varies monthly with the changes in sunrise and sunset. Due to its close proximity to 1530 WCKY in Cincinnati, OH, its coverage diminishes during the mid afternoon. The station is also heard on 102.3 FM through a translator in Elmhurst.

History

WKDC
AM 1530 signed on the air October 10, 1974. The station's call letters were originally WKDC representing the signal coverage in Will, Kane, DuPage and Cook counties. It ran 250 watts, during daytime hours only, and aired a middle of the road (MOR) format. It was owned by Frank and Lois Blotter, operating as DuPage County Broadcasters. The studios were built for stereo (Cetec Sparta stereo audio equipment) although it was not until 1976 when the FCC authorized the station to test AM stereo. Daytime and night-time findings on AM stereo were presented at the 1977 NAB Convention in Washington, DC.

In 1981, the station was sold to Robert Snyder's Snyder Broadcasting for $1 million, and it began airing show tunes. Snyder Broadcasting filed for bankruptcy on December 29, 1982, and the station was taken off the air in October 1983 and remained off the air for over a year until it was repurchased by Frank and Lois Blotter. When it returned to the air, it began airing beautiful music and adult standards. By the early 1990s, it was airing ethnic programming and big band music.

WJJG
In 1994, the station was sold to Joe Gentile for $700,000 and its call sign was changed to WJJG. The call letters stood for owner Joseph J. Gentile. Joe's nickname was "The Baron of Barrington," where he owned a Chrysler-Plymouth dealership for many years. Gentile hosted a program weekday mornings, featuring talk and adult standards. The station also featured brokered programming, including a show hosted by John H. Cox, syndicated talk shows, and The Sounds of Sinatra with Sid Mark.

WCKG
On September 19, 2012, AM 1530 changed its call letters to WCKG. In 2013, the station was sold to DuPage Radio, LLC for $290,000. Arthur Dubiel is the majority owner, and his son, Matt runs the station.

On June 27, 2017, the FCC approved WCKG to move its FM translator, W272DQ, to the top of Trump Tower in Chicago.

On April 23, 2018, WCKG changed their format from news/talk/variety to sports, with programming from Fox Sports Radio.

On March 10, 2020, WCKG launched new "Sportsbook Radio Chicago" branding, shifting its focus to content related to sports betting. The station reverted to its previous branding on March 30 due to the Coronavirus pandemic, but later restored the new branding.

In March 2021, WCKG asked the FCC to lower its power to 190 watts and operate using a long wire antenna, as the State of Illinois enacted Eminent Domain over its tower site for highway use.  With the powerful Cincinnati AM radio station on the same channel, the coverage area of the station was greatly diminished.  Its construction permit for 4,000 watts was also in jeopardy.

Translator
The station is also heard on 102.3 FM through translator W272DQ in Elmhurst.

See also
Joseph J. Gentile Center

References

External links
Official website of WCKG
Local Suburban Chicago Advertising website for WCKG

CKG
Radio stations established in 1974
1974 establishments in Illinois
Sports radio stations in the United States
CKG